Steve Sarossy is a British actor. He was born in England to Anglo-Hungarian parents.

He has appeared in Doctors, Holby City, Judge John Deed,  and The Bill.

He also appeared as Guy Matthews in EastEnders and in films such as Harts War as Lt. MK Adams.

External links

English male soap opera actors
Year of birth missing (living people)
Living people
English people of Hungarian descent
Place of birth missing (living people)